John Matsko may refer to:
 John Matsko (American football coach) (born 1951), American football offensive line coach
 John Matsko (American football player) (1933–2010)